Ferrières-sur-Sichon is a commune in the Allier department in central France.

Population

Sights
 Arboretum Paul Barge

See also
 Glozel
 Communes of the Allier department

References

Communes of Allier
Allier communes articles needing translation from French Wikipedia